Jean de Bourbon, Lord of Carency (1378 –1457), was a French prince du sang from the House of Bourbon-La Marche, a cadet branch of the House of Bourbon (itself a cadet branch of the Capetian dynasty). He was the youngest son of John I, Count of La Marche and his wife Catherine of Vendôme and the brother of James II, Count of La Marche (also King of Naples by marriage), Louis, Count of Vendôme (founder of the House of Bourbon-Vendôme, from which all post-1589 French Kings descend in the male line), Anne of Bourbon (Queen of Bavaria by marriage), and Charlotte of Bourbon (Queen of Cyprus by marriage).

Family life

Jean first married Catherine of Artois, the second daughter of Philip of Artois, the Count of Eu, and Marie of Berry. Jean and Catherine had no children, and after Catherine's death in 1420, Jean married his mistress Jeanne of Vendômois, the daughter of Hamelin of Vendômois and Alix of Bessé, on September 3 of the very same year at Le Mans. Jean de Bourbon had several children with Jeanne de Vendômois:

Pierre de Bourbon, Succeeded his father Jean as Lord of Carency
Jacques de Bourbon, Succeeded his elder brother Pierre as Lord of Carency
Philippe de Bourbon, Lord of Duisant
Eleonore de Bourbon-Carency, died young at Tours
Andriette de Bourbon-Carency

Getting Jean and Jeanne's children recognized as legitimate was a huge struggle and was only achieved in 1438 through a papal bull by Pope Eugene IV. In addition, for whatever reason(s), Jean and Jeanne's descendants in the Bourbon-Carency line were never invited to take a seat in the Conseil du Roi.

Mentions in popular culture
In 1692, over two centuries after Jean's death, Marie Catherine d'Aulnoy (also known as Madame d'Aulnoy) wrote a French language book (republished in 1729) about Jean and his life titled Histoire de Jean de Bourbon, prince de Carency. This book was translated into English in 1719. The 1692 French language book is available for free in its entirety on Google Books whereas both the 1719 English language book and the 1729 French language book are available for free in their entirety on the Internet Archive.

References

1378 births
1457 deaths
House of Bourbon
House of Bourbon-La Marche
House of Capet
Capetian dynasty
French royalty
Lords of France
15th-century peers of France